The Uncrowned King is a 1935 British historical novel by the Anglo-Hungarian writer Baroness Emmuska Orczy, best known as the creator of the Scarlet Pimpernel.

References

External links
 

Historical novels
1935 British novels
Novels by Baroness Emma Orczy
Hodder & Stoughton books